The Demon Cat (also referred to as the D.C.) is a ghost cat who is purported to haunt the government buildings of Washington, D.C., which is the capital city of the United States. Its primary haunts are the city's two main landmarks: the White House and the United States Capitol.

History 
The story of the Demon Cat dates back to the mid‑1800s when cats were brought into the basement tunnels of the United States Capitol Building to kill rats and mice. Legend states that the Demon Cat is one of these cats who never left, even after its death. Its home is supposedly the basement crypt of the Capitol Building, which was originally intended as a burial chamber for President George Washington. 

According to legend, the cat is seen before presidential elections and tragedies in Washington, D.C., allegedly being spotted by White House security guards on the night before the assassinations of John F. Kennedy and Abraham Lincoln. It is described as either a black cat or a tabby cat, and the size of an average house cat. However, witnesses report that the cat swells to "the size of a giant tiger" or an elephant, said to be 10 feet by 10 feet, when alerted. The cat would then either explode or pounce at the witness, disappearing before it managed to catch its 'victim'.

In the 1890s, the cat is said to have inexplicably vanished when some Capitol Hill guards fired their guns at it, and another supposedly died of a heart attack after seeing it.

The last official sighting of the alleged ghost was during the final days or aftermath of World War II
in the 1940s.

Explanation

According to Steve Livengood, the chief tour guide of the U.S. Capitol Historical Society, the Capitol Police force was notorious for hiring unqualified relatives and friends of Congressmen as favors, and these men would frequently be drunk whilst on patrol. Livengood believes the legend began when a security guard who was lying down in a drunken stupor was licked by one of the Capitol building's cats and mistakenly assumed it to be a giant cat. Livengood states that upon reporting the incident to his superior, the guard would have been sent home to recover, and "eventually the other guards found out that they could get a day off if they saw the demon cat".

In popular culture

Founded in 2006, the DC DemonCats are one of Washington, D.C.'s four roller derby home teams.

References

External links

American legendary creatures
Cats in popular culture
Culture of Washington, D.C.
Mythological cats
American ghosts
Cat folklore